Juan Ruiz Anchía (born June 12, 1949) is a Spanish cinematographer. His work includes James Foley's adaptation of David Mamet's Glengarry Glen Ross and At Close Range.

Early career
Anchía attended the Escuela Official de Cinematografia in Madrid, graduating in 1972, followed by a graduate in the AFI Conservatory with a Master in Visual Arts as a Director of Photography in 1981. His AFI television movie, Miss Lonelyhearts (1983), won the Cannes Film Festival for Best Foreign Film.

Filmography

Films

Television

Music videos

References

External links
 

1949 births
Living people
Spanish cinematographers
People from Bilbao